Széll, Szell is a Hungarian surname. The name comes as an archaic Turkic loanword with the Chuvash word "ҫил" (śil) which later became the Hungarian word "szél" meaning "wind". The name is topographic in nature, meaning "someone who lived in a spot exposed to the wind". The German equivalent is "Selle" and the English equivalent is "Sell". Széll may refer to:

 Christian Szell, a fictional character of Marathon Man
 Domonkos Széll (born 1989), Hungarian Olympic rower
 George Szell (1897, Budapest - 1970), a Jewish Hungarian-American conductor
 György Széll (politician) (1827, Makó - 1910, Makó), Hungarian politician
 György Széll (sociologist) (born 1941), Hungarian-German sociologist
 József Széll (1880 - 1956), a Hungarian politician
 Kálmán Széll de Duka et Szentgyörgyvölgy (1843, Gasztony - 1915, Rátót), a Hungarian politician, banker
 SS Széll Kálmán
 Susanne Szell (born 1965, Bremen), German actress

References

See also 
 Szél at Wiktionary.org

Hungarian-language surnames
Archaic words and phrases
Hungarian toponymic surnames